Geissomeria is a genus of plants in the family Acanthaceae

Selected species 
 Geissomeria ciliata Rizzini
 Geissomeria dawsonii Leonard
 Geissomeria longiflora Salzm. ex Nees (= Geissomeria macrophylla Nees)
 Geissomeria schottiana Nees

References

 
Acanthaceae genera